The 1788–89 United States Senate elections were the first U.S. Senate elections following the adoption of the Constitution of the United States. They coincided with the election of George Washington as the first president of the United States. As these elections were prior to the ratification of the Seventeenth Amendment in 1913, senators were chosen by state legislatures.

Senators were elected over a wide range of time throughout 1788 and 1789. Among the original 13 states, ten of them selected their senators prior to the official start of the 1st United States Congress on March 4, 1789, ranging from Pennsylvania in September 1788 to South Carolina in January 1789. New York failed to elect its senators until July 1789. North Carolina and Rhode Island did not ratify the Constitution until after the 1st Congress began; North Carolina then elected its senators in November 1789, but Rhode Island failed to ratify the Constitution until 1790.

Under ArticleI, Section 3, Clause2 of the U.S. Constitution, the actual division of the Senate's seats into the three classes was not performed until after the 1st Congress convened. Thus, the 20 elected senators from the ten initial states did not know ahead of time whether they would serve Class1's interim two-year term, Class2's interim four-year term, or the full six-year term of Class3. Then starting with New York, a random draw determined which classes each new state's seats would belong to while keeping the three classes as close to the same size as possible.

As of these elections, formal organized political parties had yet to form in the United States, but two political factions were present: The coalition of senators who supported President George Washington's administration were known as the Pro-Administration Party, and the senators against him as the Anti-Administration Party. Among the initial 20 senators elected before the 1st Congress began on March 4, 1789, 13 of them were Pro-Administration.

Resulting composition 
Note: There were no political parties in this Congress. Members are informally grouped into factions of similar interest, based on an analysis of their voting record.

Beginning of the 1st Congress 
New York failed to elect its senators until after the Congress began, so its seats are labelled here as "Vacant."  North Carolina and Rhode Island did not ratify the Constitution until after the Congress began, so their seats are not included here.

Division into the three classes

ArticleI, Section 3, Clause2 of the U.S. Constitution specified that the actual division of the senate seats into the three classes was to be performed after these initial states elected their senators:

The allocation of the classes by lot then took place in May 1789, two months after the first Congress began in March 1789. New York was then the first to be treated as a "new state admitted to the Union" under this process when they elected their senators in July 1789, drawing lots to determine which classes their seats would belong to while keeping the three classes as close to the same size as possible.

Race summaries 
Except if/when noted, the number following candidates is the whole number vote(s), not a percentage.

Races leading to the 1st Congress 
In these general elections, the winners were elected in advance of March 4, 1789, the date set to be the beginning of the 1st Congress. Ordered by state, then by the class that they were eventually assigned in May 1789.

Elections during the 1st Congress 
In these general elections, the winners were elected in 1789 after March 4; ordered by election date.

Connecticut

Delaware

Georgia

Maryland 

The Maryland General Assembly convened on December 10, 1788, in order to vote for the inaugural holders of Maryland's seats. There were two candidates for each seat, and all four were of the Federalist Party.

Charles Carroll won election over Uriah Forrest by a margin of 3.70%, or 3 votes, for one of the seats.

John Henry won election over George Gale by a margin of 2.44%, or 2 votes, for the other seat.

In May 1789, the lot draw performed by the 1st U.S. Senate assigned Carroll's seat to Class 1, whose term would expire March 4, 1791, and Henry's seat to Class 3, whose term would expire on March 3, 1795.

Massachusetts

New Hampshire

New Jersey

New York 

The election was held in July 1789. It was the first such election, and before the actual election the New York State Legislature had to establish rules for proceeding.  They decided to ballot separately, and then pass a joint resolution once they had concurred in the election of two candidates.

On July 15, Schuyler was nominated first, and members of each chamber attempted to substitute the names of other candidates, including Ezra L'Hommedieu and Rufus King.  These motions failed, and Schuyler was elected by a vote of 37 to 19 in the Assembly, and 13 to 6 in the Senate.

King's election came after individual legislators and the two chambers failed to agree on the election of James Duane, Ezra L'Hommedieu, or Lewis Morris.  King was then elected unanimously by the Assembly, and by a vote of 11 to 8 in the Senate.  On July 16, Schuyler and King were appointed to the U.S. Senate by a joint resolution of the State Legislature.

King took his seat on July 25, and drew the lot for Class 3, his term expiring on March 3, 1795. Schuyler took his seat on July 27, and drew the lot for Class 1, his term expiring on March 3, 1791. The 1st United States Congress convened at New York City, as did the regular session of the New York State Legislature in January 1790. Schuyler retained his seat in the State Senate while serving concurrently in the U.S. Senate. Schuyler was also elected on January 15 a member of the State's Council of Appointments which consisted of the Governor of New York, and four State Senators elected annually by the State Assembly. On January 27, the New York State Legislature resolved that it was "incompatible with the U.S. Constitution for any person holding an office under the United States government at the same time to have a seat in the Legislature of this State", and that if a member of the State Legislature was elected or appointed to a federal office, the seat should be declared vacant upon acceptance. Thus U.S. Senator Schuyler, Federal Judge James Duane and Congressmen John Hathorn and John Laurance vacated their seats in the State Senate. On April 3, John Cantine, a member of the Council of Appointments, raised the question if Schuyler, after vacating his State Senate seat, was still a member of the Council. Philip Livingston, another member, held that once elected a member could not be expelled in any case. On April 5, Governor Clinton asked the State Assembly for a decision, but the latter refused to do so, arguing that it was a question of law, which could be pursued in the courts. Schuyler thus kept his seat in the Council of Appointments until the end of the term.

North Carolina 

North Carolina was the 12th state to ratify the new United States Constitution, doing so in November 1789, months after the First Congress had first convened. A few days after that ratification, on November 26, 1789, the two houses of the state legislature jointly elected incumbent Governor Samuel Johnston (who was considered pro-Administration) as North Carolina's first United States Senator. The minutes of the state Senate indicate that the two houses had actually voted for both U.S. Senate seats, but that no candidate received a majority for the second seat.

Days later, the state Senate sent messages to the state House of Commons nominating candidates for the state's other Senate seat. These included William Lenoir, William Blount, Benjamin Hawkins, and Timothy Bloodworth. Hawkins (who was also pro-Administration at the time) was elected jointly by the two houses on December 8, 1789.

Pennsylvania 

The election was held on September 30, 1788. The Pennsylvania General Assembly, consisting of the House of Representatives and the Senate, elected Pennsylvania's first two United States senators, William Maclay and Robert Morris. Anti-Federalist William Maclay was elected to the two-year staggered term of the Class 1 seat, while Federalist and founding father Robert Morris was elected to the full six-year term of the Class 3 seat.

While no official results of the votes were recorded, the State House recorded minutes of its election:

South Carolina

Virginia

See also 
 1788–89 United States elections
 1788–89 United States House of Representatives elections
 1st United States Congress

Notes

References 
 Party Division in the Senate, 1789-Present, via Senate.gov
The New York Civil List compiled in 1858 (see: pg. 113 for State Senators 1788-89; pg. 114 for State Senators 1789-90; page 164 for Members of Assembly 1788-89; pg. 165 for Members of Assembly 1789-90)
 :
 
 
 
 
  History of Political Parties in the State of New-York by Jabez Delano Hammond (pages 43f)